The Rainen is a mountain, and the fifth highest peak in the Swabian Jura of southern Germany. It lies about 2 kilometres east of Deilingen and, together with the Montschenloch, Bol and Wandbühl, forms a mountain chain. The Rainen belongs to the Region of the 10 Thousanders and is the northernmost summit in the mountain group.

References

Mountains and hills of the Swabian Jura
One-thousanders of Germany